The 2016 SBS Drama Awards, presented by Seoul Broadcasting System (SBS), took place on December 31, 2016 at SBS Prism Tower, Sangam-dong, Mapo-gu, Seoul. It was hosted by Lee Hwi-jae, Jang Keun-suk and Minah.

Winners and nominees

Presenters

Special performances

References

External links
 

2016 television awards
SBS Drama Awards
2016 in South Korea
December 2016 events in South Korea